Carter High School may refer to a number of high schools:

 Carter High School (Strawberry Plains, Tennessee), in Knox County, Tennessee, United States
 Carter High School (South Africa), in Pietermaritzburg, KwaZulu-Natal, South Africa
 David W. Carter High School, in Dallas, Texas, United States
 Wilmer Amina Carter High School, in Rialto, California, United States